Bramlet is a surname. Notable people with the surname include:

 Al Bramlet (1917–1977), labor union leader
 Casey Bramlet (born 1981), American football player
 Corey Bramlet (born 1983), American football player, brother of Casey

See also
 Bramlett